Maurice Quinlivan is an Irish Sinn Féin politician who has been a Teachta Dála (TD) for the Limerick City constituency since the 2016 general election. He was appointed Chair of the Committee on Enterprise, Trade and Employment in September 2020.

He gained prominence for being libelled by Willie O'Dea, while O'Dea was Minister for Defence.

Personal life
He was born in Ballynanty and resides in nearby Stenson Park, Limerick, with his wife. His brother Nessan Quinlivan, is a former Provisional IRA volunteer. He has 3 sisters.

Political career
He previously ran unsuccessfully as a Sinn Féin candidate at the 2004 local elections for Limerick City Council and for Limerick East at the 2007 general election. He was elected to Limerick City Council in 2009.

During the 2009 local election campaign, Willie O'Dea gave an interview to the Limerick Leader. In response to criticism about the use of Department of Defence resources for constituency work, O'Dea attacked Quinlivan and claimed that Quinlivan was running a brothel.

Quinlivan responded by launching a High Court defamation challenge against O'Dea. As part of his defence O'Dea swore under oath an affidavit, that he had not made this remark. He was forced to retract his denial after the release of a recording of the conversation in which the allegations were made by O'Dea. The case was subsequently settled out of court with O'Dea paying an undisclosed sum in damages and apologising for the remarks. However, O'Dea was forced to resign as Minister for Defence, over accusations that he had committed perjury.

On the council, Quinlivan has supported an extension of Limerick city's boundary, opposed the planned merger of Limerick City and County Councils and campaigned for greater resources to tackle Limerick's drug problem. He, along with Independent Councillor and former Mayor of Limerick John Gilligan, are the only two councillors on Limerick City Council to oppose to the Household charge. Both men have refused to pay the charge.

He was a candidate in the Limerick City constituency at the 2011 general election. He received 8.6% of the first preference votes, coming fifth in the four seat constituency ahead of incumbent Fianna Fáil TD Peter Power, and was not elected. He was re-elected at the 2014 local elections, topping the poll with 24.5% of the vote. He was elected at the 2016 general election taking the second seat in the Limerick City constituency. He was re-elected at the 2020 general election, topping the poll ahead of his constituency rival, Willie O'Dea.

References

External links

Maurice Quinlivan's page on the Sinn Féin website

Living people
Local councillors in County Limerick
Members of the 32nd Dáil
Sinn Féin TDs (post-1923)
Members of the 33rd Dáil
Year of birth missing (living people)